Malá Čierna is a village and municipality in Žilina District in the Žilina Region of northern Slovakia.

History
In historical records the village was first mentioned in 1471.

Geography
The municipality lies at an altitude of 530 metres and covers an area of 4.262 km2. It has a population of about 333.

External links
https://web.archive.org/web/20070513023228/http://www.statistics.sk/mosmis/eng/run.html

Villages and municipalities in Žilina District